Alstroemeria discolor is a species of monocotyledonous plants from Alstroemeria genus, Alstroemeriaceae family, described by Pierfelice Ravenna. According to Catalogue of Life Alstroemeria discolor does not have any known subspecies.

References 

discolor